Michael Lederman Littman (born August 30, 1966) is a computer scientist. He works mainly in reinforcement learning, but has done work in machine learning, game theory, computer networking, partially observable Markov decision process solving, computer solving of analogy problems and other areas. He is currently a University Professor of Computer Science at Brown University, where he has taught since 2012.

Career
Before graduate school, Littman worked with Thomas Landauer at Bellcore and was granted a patent for one of the earliest systems for cross-language information retrieval. Littman received his Ph.D. in computer science from Brown University in 1996. From 1996 to 1999, he was a professor at Duke University. During his time at Duke, he worked on an automated crossword solver PROVERB, which won an Outstanding Paper Award in 1999 from AAAI and competed in the American Crossword Puzzle Tournament. From 2000 to 2002, he worked at AT&T. From 2002 to 2012, he was a professor at Rutgers University; he chaired the department from 2009-12. In Summer 2012 he returned to Brown University as a full professor. He has also taught at Georgia Institute of Technology, where he is listed as an adjunct professor.

Awards 
 Elected as an ACM Fellow in 2018 for "contributions to the design and analysis of sequential decision-making algorithms in artificial intelligence".
 Winner of the IFAAMAS Influential Paper Award (2014)
 
 Winner of the AAAI “Shakey” Award for Overfitting: Machine Learning Music Video (2014)
 
 Winner of the AAAI “Shakey” Award for Short Video for Aibo Ingenuity (2007)
 
 Winner of the Warren I. Susman Award for Excellence in Teaching at Rutgers (2011)
 
 Winner of the Robert B. Cox Award at Duke (1999)
 
 Winner of the AAAI Outstanding Paper Award (1999)

See also
 Lisa Littman (spouse)

References

Press References 
 Smart Home Programming: If-Then Statements Make A Comeback- Science 2.0
 Computer Science for the Rest of Us- New York Times
 Many Scientists Dismiss the Fear of Robots- Fortune
 Celebrating the 20th Anniversary of MIME Email Attachments- NJ Tech Weekly
 Humans Beat Poker Bot… Barely -NBC News
 Duke Researchers Pit Computer Against Human Crossword Puzzle Players 
 Going Cruciverbalistic- American Scientist

Udacity Courses 
 Intro to Algorithms (over 88k student signups)
 Machine Learning (over 83k student signups)

References

External links 

 Michael Littman's Homepage
 YouTube page
 Music Videos

Living people
American computer scientists
Machine learning researchers
Brown University alumni
Duke University faculty
Rutgers University faculty
Brown University faculty
1966 births
Fellows of the Association for the Advancement of Artificial Intelligence
Fellows of the Association for Computing Machinery